Hibbertia glabrisepala is a species of flowering plant in the family Dilleniaceae and is endemic to the south-west of Western Australia. It is an erect to sprawling shrub with linear to narrow oblong leaves and bright yellow flowers borne on the ends of short side shoots, with fifteen stamens in groups surrounding the five carpels.

Description
There are fifteen stamens arranged in three groups around the five carpels, each carpel containing a single ovule. Flowering occurs from May to October.

Taxonomy
Hibbertia glabrisepala was first formally described in 2002 by Judy Wheeler in the journal Nuytsia from specimens she collected near Kalbarri in 1984. The specific epithet (glabrisepala) refers to the glabrous sepals.

Distribution and habitat
This hibbertia grows in sandy soil in heath and mallee in the Avon Wheatbelt, Geraldton Sandplains and Yalgoo biogeographic regions of south-western Western Australia.

Conservation status
Hibbertia glabrisepala is classified as "not threatened" by the Government of Western Australia Department of Parks and Wildlife.

See also
List of Hibbertia species

References

glabrisepala
Flora of Western Australia
Plants described in 2002